Attorney General Hart may refer to:

Augustus L. Hart (1849–1901), Attorney General of California
Richard Hart (Jamaican politician) (1917–2013), Attorney General of Grenada
William H. H. Hart (1848–1903), Attorney General of California

See also
General Hart (disambiguation)